The 15th constituency of the Nord is a French legislative constituency in the Nord département.

Description

Nord's 15th constituency includes the large towns of Bailleul and Hazebrouck in the north west of the department.

The constituency swang between left and right from 1988 to 2017 having previously been dominated by the French Communist Party throughout the 1960s and 1970s. Jean-Pierre Allossery of the PS gained the seat at the 2012 French legislative election from the conservative Union for a Popular Movement. It was part of the La République En Marche! landslide win in the 2017 French legislative election, but the deputy, Jennifer de Temmerman, left the party and in May 2020, she was one of the 17 initial members of the short-lived Ecology Democracy Solidarity group in the National Assembly, but left shortly after to become part of the Liberties and Territories group. The seat was gained by Pierrick Berteloot of the far-right RN in the 2022 election.

Historic Representation

Election results

2022

 
 
 
 
 
 
 
|-
| colspan="8" bgcolor="#E9E9E9"|
|-

2017

2012

 
 
 
 
 
 
|-
| colspan="8" bgcolor="#E9E9E9"|
|-

2007

 
 
 
 
 
 
 
 
|-
| colspan="8" bgcolor="#E9E9E9"|
|-

2002

 
 
 
 
 
 
 
 
|-
| colspan="8" bgcolor="#E9E9E9"|
|-

1997

Sources and References

 Official results of French elections from 1998: 

15